Edson Cholbi do Nascimento (born 27 August 1970), commonly known as Edinho, is a Brazilian football coach and former player who played as a goalkeeper.

Playing career
Edinho played for four clubs, Santos, Portuguesa Santista, São Caetano and Ponte Preta before retiring from professional football in 1999, at the age of 29.

His greatest achievement was playing in the Santos side that finished runner-up in the Série A in 1995.

Post-playing career
Edinho was hired as Santos' goalkeeping coach on 9 February 2007. Until 2015, he was the team's assistant coach.

On 13 April 2015, Edinho was announced as manager of Mogi Mirim, but was dismissed on 31 May. He was named in charge of Água Santa on 27 May 2016, but resigned on 19 September.

On 14 October 2016, Edinho took over his father's hometown club Tricordiano for the ensuing campaign, but was relieved from his duties the following 8 February, after only two official matches.

On 1 November 2019, Edinho returned to Santos as a development coordinator. In October of the following year, he was named manager of the under-23s.

In 2021, Edinho arrived at Londrina to coach the under-20 team. He was an interim head coach of the first team in 2022, after the dismissal of Vinícius Eutrópio, and was permanently appointed head coach ahead of the 2023 season. On 5 February 2023, however, he resigned after only one win in seven matches.

Personal life
Edinho is the son of football legend Pelé with his first wife Rosemeri Cholbi Nascimento, who is of Brazilian-Argentinian background. Pelé's second son and Edson's brother Joshua was also a footballer; a forward, he too played for Santos' youth setup.

In 2005, he was arrested for money laundering and drug trafficking. He appealed the sentence and was allowed to remain free during his appeal. In 2014, he was given a 33-year sentence for the charges but adamantly denies any involvement. A court reduced the sentence to 12 years and 10 months, but Edinho must serve his sentence in jail.

In 2017, Edinho started to serve his sentence in prison, but was given the semi-open regime in the following year. In September 2019, he was given the open regime.

References

External links
 
 

1970 births
Living people
Sportspeople from Santos, São Paulo
Brazilian drug traffickers
Brazilian footballers
Association football goalkeepers
Campeonato Brasileiro Série A players
Santos FC players
Associação Atlética Portuguesa (Santos) players
Associação Desportiva São Caetano players
Associação Atlética Ponte Preta players
Brazilian football managers
Campeonato Brasileiro Série B managers
Mogi Mirim Esporte Clube managers
Esporte Clube Água Santa managers
Londrina Esporte Clube managers
Santos FC non-playing staff
People convicted of money laundering
Pelé